The 4 Hours of Silverstone (formerly the 1000 km of Silverstone and 6 Hours of Silverstone) is an endurance sports car race held at Silverstone Circuit near the Northamptonshire villages of Silverstone and Whittlebury.  First run in 1976 as part of the World Sportscar Championship, the race was a part of the FIA World Endurance Championship between 2013 and 2019, but the 2020 race was cancelled due to the COVID-19 pandemic and the race didn’t return for 2021. The RAC Tourist Trophy has been awarded to the winners of the event.

History
In 1975, a round of the World Championship of Makes was not held in Britain for one of the first times since 1966. The 1000 km Brands Hatch which had been run almost consecutively during that period went under hiatus while track upgrades were carried out. Following upgrades of its own in 1975, plans were made for sportscars to return to Britain by using Silverstone instead of Brands Hatch. The event was a six-hour endurance, part of the Group 5 World Championship.

The first running consisted of a small field as some season competitors chose not to compete. British drivers John Fitzpatrick and Tom Walkinshaw managed to upset the factory teams by scoring the inaugural victory in a BMW. The following year, competition grew as the factory Porsche team, under the guise of Martini Racing, earned their first of two consecutive victories for drivers Jochen Mass and Jacky Ickx. The Porsche factory team was not able to continue their streak into 1979 when their lead car crashed, leaving the privateer Gelo Racing Porsche to a dominant win.

1980 saw the first victory by a sports-prototype. Alain de Cadenet managed to win the home event as a driver, team owner, as well as a constructor when he and Desiré Wilson won by 18 seconds in a car of his own design. A Group 5 car took its final victory in 1981 with the all-German Velga Racing Team before the class was phased out.

1982 was the first year of the Group C category in the World Championship, although the race that year was actually won by an older Group 6 Lancia. The first Group C victory came in 1983 as Porsche returned to their factory dominance of the event, going on to win the 1984 and 1985 events as well. Jacky Ickx and Jochen Mass still hold record of most wins, having won the race four times in 1977, 1978, 1984 and 1985. In 1986 British success returned as the Jaguar factory team was able to upset Porsche for the first time since the company had returned to racing. Jaguar then began to dominate in a fashion similar to Porsche, as they too won the next two years.  American Eddie Cheever co-drove in each of the three victories.

No race was held in 1989 as Donington temporarily replaced Silverstone on the schedule, but sportscars returned in 1990 for a shorter 480 km event. Jaguar returned to their winning ways straight away before going on to earn a fifth straight victory in a 430 km event in 1991. Only after Jaguar officially retired from the World Championship was another manufacturer able to once again earn victory at Silverstone, this time being Peugeot. A lack of entrants however lead to the cancellation of the World Championship, temporarily ending endurance racing at the circuit. The race did make a one-year comeback in 2000 as part of the American Le Mans Series. The race served as a precursor to the European Le Mans Series that followed in 2001.

In 2004, the new Le Mans Endurance Series was created to resurrect several 1000 km endurance races in a modern era. Among these was Silverstone, running at its original distance.  Once again, British success started off the return of the event as Allan McNish and the British Audi team won the event. Audi and McNish won again the following year, this time under the control of the French Oreca team, although the race was heavily hampered by rain.  Silverstone took a brief hiatus in 2006 as Donington replaced the event once again, only to return once again in 2007. Peugeot earned their second victory, this time with a diesel-powered Le Mans prototype. The 2010 edition was the inaugural race of the Le Mans Intercontinental Cup, as well as the first time the race used the new  "Arena" configuration. The race continued in 2012 as a part of the FIA World Endurance Championship.

Winners

† - Race went under a 6-hour time limit. Only 776 km of the 1000 km scheduled were covered.

External links
 Le Mans Series - 2007 1000 km of Silverstone

References

 
Recurring sporting events established in 1976